Coleophora pulmonariella is a moth of the family Coleophoridae. It is found from Sweden and northern Russia to the Pyrenees and Italy, and from France to Romania.

The larvae feed on Myosotis palustris, Myosotis sylvatica, Pulmonaria mollissima, Pulmonaria obscura, Pulmonaria officinalis, Symphytum officinale and Symphytum tuberosum.

References

pulmonariella
Moths of Europe
Moths described in 1874